Brian Pariani (born July 2, 1965) is an American football coach. Pariani is a longtime assistant of Gary Kubiak and was a member of four Super Bowl winning teams with the San Francisco 49ers in Super Bowl XXIX and the Denver Broncos in Super Bowl XXXII, Super Bowl XXXIII, and Super Bowl 50.

Coaching
Pariani has more than 30 years of coaching experience, and over 20 coaching tight ends all of them with Gary Kubiak with the exception of the 2005 season, when Pariani was at Syracuse. Hall of Fame Tight end Shannon Sharpe was named to 4 consecutive Pro Bowls (1995-1998) and three straight All-Pro teams (1996-1998) under Pariani. On February 7, 2016, Pariani was part of the Broncos coaching staff that won Super Bowl 50. In the game, the Broncos defeated the Carolina Panthers by a score of 24–10.
Pariani was fired from the Denver Broncos on January 12, 2017.

References

External links
 Denver Broncos bio

Living people
Baltimore Ravens coaches
Denver Broncos coaches
Houston Texans coaches
San Francisco 49ers coaches
Syracuse Orange football coaches
UCLA Bruins football coaches
1965 births
Las Vegas Raiders coaches